Lower Wye Gorge is a  biological and geological Site of Special Scientific Interest in Gloucestershire, notified in 1954 and renotified 1987.  The site includes two Gloucestershire Wildlife Trust nature reserves being Ban-y-gor Wood and Lancaut. The Natural England citation states a revision for Lancaut inclusion.

The site (Lancaut and Ban-y-gor) is listed in the 'Forest of Dean Local Plan Review' as a Key Wildlife Site (KWS).

Wye Valley Woodlands/ Coetiroedd Dyffryn Gwy are recognised as a Special Area of Conservation (SAC) under the EU Habitats Directive.

Location and habitat
The Lower Wye valley Gorge is in the Wye Valley Area of Outstanding Natural Beauty. The woodlands of the lower Wye Valley are one of the most important areas for woodland conservation in the United Kingdom. This is an area of semi-natural woodland which is continuous along the gorge sides. The woods are a mixture of stand types which are considered to be similar to the original natural woods of the valley. Rare and local species are present.

There are two units of assessment. Unit 1 is a  site and includes Ban-y-gor Wood nature reserve. Unit 2 is a  site and includes Lancaut nature reserve. Wintour's Leap is part of the Lancaut nature reserve.

Lancaut reserve

Lancaut reserve is a  site and lies on the east bank of the Wye Gorge, north of Chepstow. The gorge is formed from massive Lower Carboniferous limestones and sandstones and rises 250 ft above the tidal River Wye. The reserve is made up of Lancaut Wood, Pen Moel and Chapelhouse Woods, disused quarries, limestone cliffs,  and saltmarsh.  It is one of the few sites in the United Kingdom showing the natural transition from saltmarsh to valley woodland.  It became a Gloucestershire Wildlife Trust reserve in 1971. There is a public footpath which runs through the woods from the ruins of Lancaut Chapel to below Pen Moel, which returns by Offa's Dyke Path.

Trees
The steep slopes and historic quarrying of limestone for agriculture and construction, such as the Avonmouth Docks, have resulted in a diverse woodland. Trees include pedunculate oak, ash, field maple, yew, small-leaved lime, wild service-tree, wayfaring tree and rare whitebeams.

Ground flora
The ground flora includes ferns and a spring display of primrose, bluebell, dog-violet, wood anemone and early purple orchid. Also recorded are green hellebore, bird's nest orchid and fingered sedge. Wild flowers grow on the open rock faces, cliff ledges and in the quarries.  These include hairy violet, yellow-wort, lesser calamint, oxeye daisy, red valerian and shining crane's-bill. The flora of the saltmarsh includes sea aster, English scurvy-grass, sea milkwort and buck's-horn plantain.  There are a variety of lichens and mosses.

Birds and mammals
Lancaut's cliffs, which are south-facing, are regular nesting sites for peregrine falcons and ravens. Sparrowhawk, goshawk, kestrel, cormorant, heron, shelduck, wood warbler, lapwing and goldcrest are amongst the wide range of birds recorded.  `

Conservation
Invasive Sycamore is controlled and scrub removed from limestone scree areas to promote a grassland flora. Erosion of the saltmarsh from natural and artificial causes is considered a major problem.

Ban-y-gor Wood
Ban-y-gor Wood is a  site and faces north and is, therefore, a much darker, cooler and wetter wood than Lancaut. The wood was donated to the Gloucestershire Wildlife Trust in 1995 by the Clay Estate, and part of Lancaut was given at the same time. The wood descends about a 100 metres down to the River Wye edge.  The slopes are very steep and there are areas of cliff exposures, bare sandstone, and limestone rocks. Although steep and potentially inaccessible, there is evidence of quarrying in the past. There is derelict winding gear present which was used to pump water up from the river.

This is an area of secluded habitat, carpeted with ferns and mosses,  with large ancient coppice and pollards.  A single path descends via a small glade towards the river.

Trees
The tree canopy includes beech (some huge old coppice stools), ash, sessile oak, silver birch, common whitebeam and small-leaved lime. Yew is the dominant shrub, particularly beneath beech trees.  There is hazel coppice, field maple, hawthorn, holly and goat willow. There is a rare hybrid present between rowan and whitebeam.

Ground flora
The conditions are damp and acidic and the ground flora includes foxglove, woodruff, tutsan, slender St John's-wort, wild madder, great woodrush, wood sage, bilberry, wood sorrel.  The many ferns include hard shield fern, hard fern, scaly male-fern and maidenhair spleenwort. The general woodland flowers include bluebell, wood anemone, primrose, dog-violet and yellow archangel.  There are many mosses and liverworts present.

Mammals
Dormice are recorded within the woodland.

Conservation
Structural variety is increased by cutting glades and small coppice coupes particularly either side of the path.

Publications

 Kelham, A, Sanderson, J, Doe, J, Edgeley-Smith, M, et al., 1979, 1990, 2002 editions, 'Nature Reserves of the Gloucestershire Trust for Nature Conservation/Gloucestershire Wildlife Trust'
 'Lancaut and Ban-y-Gor Nature Reserves – Information and the Lancaut Walk', (undated), Gloucestershire Wildlife Trust
 'Where to see Wildlife in the Forest of Dean', January 2012, Gloucestershire Wildlife Trust

See also
Upper Wye Gorge
Wye Valley AONB

References

SSSI Source
 Natural England SSSI information on the citation
 Natural England SSSI information on the Lower Wye Gorge units

External links

 Gloucestershire Wildlife Trust
 Natural England (SSSI information)

Sites of Special Scientific Interest in Gloucestershire
Sites of Special Scientific Interest notified in 1954
Nature reserves in Gloucestershire
Forests and woodlands of Gloucestershire
River Wye
Tidenham